Tommy McLeod (26 December 1920 – 16 August 1999) was a Scottish footballer who played as an inside forward.

References

External links

LFC History profile

1920 births
1999 deaths
Scottish footballers
Liverpool F.C. players
Sportspeople from Musselburgh
Association football inside forwards
Chesterfield F.C. players
English Football League players
Wisbech Town F.C. players
Footballers from East Lothian